Akkaa paalle is a Finnish television series broadcast in Finland since 1994. The series is directed by Anitta Pankkonen and written by Taneli Mäkelä and Pirkka-Pekka Petelius.

The programme won the Finnish View's Choice Award in 1997.

The series is set in the 1960s and is about four men trying to do something with their lives, with little result.

Cast
Taneli Mäkelä ....  Kaino / ... (17 episodes, 1994–2006)
Mikko Kivinen ....  Aulis / ... (17 episodes, 1994–2006)
Vesa Vierikko ....  Anssi Ahlmgren / ... (16 episodes, 1994–2006)
Pirkka-Pekka Petelius ....  Sulo Tyynelä / ... (16 episodes, 1994–2006)
Jonas Halldorius ....  Mikael Tyynelä / ... (16 episodes, 1994–2006)

External links
 

Finnish comedy television series
Television series set in the 1960s